The Eternal City is a 1923 American silent drama film directed by George Fitzmaurice, from a script by Ouida Bergère based on the 1901 Hall Caine novel of the same name, and starring Barbara La Marr, Lionel Barrymore, and Bert Lytell.

The film was produced by Samuel Goldwyn Productions, distributed by Associated First National, and was a remake of The Eternal City (1915) starring Pauline Frederick. This film is the second filming of the 1902 play starring Viola Allen which was also based on Caine's novel. This film is notable as the first production of Samuel Goldwyn's personal production company.

Cast

Production
The entire story from the novel was changed by Ouida Bergere by eliminating every element of religion in the script. George Fitzmaurice filmed King Victor Emmanuel III and his prime minister, Benito Mussolini, reviewing Italian troops. In October 1923, Fitzmaurice sent Mussolini a copy of the finished film. Mussolini played a small role in the film and had been extremely helpful to Fitzmaurice and his company during their three months in Rome. Battalions of soldiers were delegated to appear in the film and guard the cast. Permission was obtained to use the Coliseum, the Forum and the Roman Baths, and the Old and New Appian Way as film locations.

Preservation
The Eternal City is a partially lost film. The last two reels (28 minutes long) were rediscovered in 2006 by Italian film historian Giuliana Muscio in the archives of New York's Museum of Modern Art, and screened in 2014 at the Pordenone Silent Film Festival.

See also
Lionel Barrymore filmography
List of incomplete or partially lost films

References

External links

 Some of the cast shipboard leaving for Italy (archived)
Stills at nitrateville.com

1923 films
American silent feature films
American black-and-white films
Lost American films
Films based on British novels
American films based on plays
Remakes of American films
Films directed by George Fitzmaurice
Samuel Goldwyn Productions films
1923 drama films
Films based on multiple works
Silent American drama films
First National Pictures films
Films with screenplays by Ouida Bergère
Films set in Rome
1923 lost films
Lost drama films
Films about Fascist Italy
1920s American films
1920s English-language films
English-language drama films